Kaymak is a Turkish surname. Notable people with the surname include:

Burhanettin Kaymak (born 1973), Turkish-German footballer
Erol Kaymak, Turkish Cypriot academic

Turkish-language surnames